Across the Cemetery is a 1964 Soviet drama film directed by Viktor Turov.

Plot 
The film takes place in the autumn of 1942. The Nazis approached Stalingrad. They are opposed by Belarusian partisans who were left without shells, as a result of which they decided to send a young guy named Mikhas along with Sazon Ivanovich to a mechanic. They successfully reached the point where the shells were hidden and suddenly they saw the Germans...

Cast 
 Vladimir Belokurov as Sazon Ivanovich Kulik
 Yelizaveta Uvarova as Sofya Kazimirovna Bugreyeva
 Galina Morachyova as Yeva
 Antonina Bendova as Klava
 Vladimir Yemelyanov as Vasiliy Yegorovich Bugreyev
 Vladimir Martynov as Mikhas Pashkevich
 Igor Yasulovich as Feliks Bugreyev
 Pyotr Savin as Kozakov
 Valentin Bryleev as Policeman
 Vitold Janpavlis as German Officer (uncredited)

References

External links 
 

1964 films
1960s Russian-language films
Soviet drama films
1964 drama films